This was the first edition of the event.

Paolo Lorenzi won the title, defeating Víctor Estrella Burgos 4–6, 6–3, 6–3 in the final.

Seeds

Draw

Finals

Top half

Bottom half

References
 Main Draw
 Qualifying Draw

Claro Open Cali - Singles
2014 Singles